Sugarplum is a common name for several plants and may refer to:

Amelanchier canadensis, native to eastern North America
Diospyros virginiana
Prune plum (Prunus domestica subsp. domestica)

See also 
 Sugar plum, a type of candy